Stigmatogaster is a genus of centipedes in the family Himantariidae, containing the following species: Centipedes in this genus range from 5 cm to 10 cm in length, have 83 to 111 pairs of legs, and are found in the Mediterranean region.

 Stigmatogaster arcishericulis Brölemann, 1904
Stigmatogaster atlanteus (Verhoeff, 1938)
Stigmatogaster dimidiatus (Meinert, 1870)
Stigmatogaster excavatus (Verhoeff, 1924)
Stigmatogaster gracilis (Meinert, 1870)
Stigmatogaster sardoa Verhoeff, 1901
Stigmatogaster superbus (Meinert, 1870)
Stigmatogaster tufi Iorio, 2021
Stigmatogaster souletina and Stigmatogaster subterraneus have been moved to the genus Haplophilus, but the change is not universally accepted; many sources still classify them in the genus Stigmatogaster.

References

Centipede genera
Geophilomorpha